William Ayres (6 April 1906 – 13 December 1978) was a South African cricketer. He played in two first-class matches for Border in 1939/40.

See also
 List of Border representative cricketers

References

External links
 

1906 births
1978 deaths
South African cricketers
Border cricketers
Cricketers from Port Elizabeth